Football Club Abazg Sukhum is a football club in the city of Sukhum, in the state of Abkhazia that competes in the Abkhazian Premier League.

History
Founded on 1995 in the city of Sukhum in the state of Abkhazia, the club is affiliated with the Football Federation of Abkhazia.

Titles
 Abkhazian Premier League (1)  
 Abkhazian Cup (2)

References 

Association football clubs established in 2005